Aldo Colombini (19 March 1951 – 12 February 2014) was an Italian-born magician, lecturer, author and media producer.  At the time of his death he was married to Rachel Colombini (previously known as Rachel Wild, Rachel Fenton and Rachel Jones), also a magician.  Rachel died circa 2018, after rumors of her death circulated on the internet in 2017.  When he first moved to the United States (from his native Modena, Italy) in 1993, he spoke no English. He created and marketed hundreds of magic tricks, along with numerous books and instructional videos on the topic of magic. He wrote a long-running column for The Linking Ring magazine, entitled, "As Always, Aldo".

Books/Writing 
 "The Close-up Magic of Aldo Colombini"
 What's Up Deck?
 He contributed multiple articles to Harry Lorayne's long-running journal, Apocalypse.
 Tra La Via Emilia e il West con un Mazzo di Carte (Ebook)
 i Tre Orsacchiotti (Ebook)
 Matrix per Gente Pigra (Ebook)
 Incredibili Illusioni Improvvisate (Ebook)
 E Adesso cosa Dico? (Ebook)
 Carte Diem (Ebook)
 Il Giocoliere Comico (Ebook)
 Alta quota (Ebook)
 Un Comico Taglio (Ebook)
 Gorgo'n Zola (Ebook)
 Il Segno Dei Cinque (Ebook)
 il Libro Dei Book Test (Ebook)
 pronto intervento (Ebook)

Instructional Videos 
Aldo has made or has appeared in the following instructional videos:

 Card Festival (DVD & VOD formats)
 Still Ringing Around (DVD and VOD formats)
 Roped In
 ESP Card Magic 1 - 20
 Self Working Packet Tricks
 Green Carpet
 Fireworks
 Aldo On Trost 1 - 15
 Essentials 1 - 3
 Jumbo Coincidence
 Razzamataz
 Magic Italian Style
 Packet Tricks Picks
 Impromptu Card Magic 1 - 6
 A Few Good Cards
 True Magic 1 - 2
 Still Ringing Around
 Three Ring Concerto
 Tested Ten Card Poker Deal
 Card Capers
 All Hands on Deck
 Jack in the Box
 Card Festival
 Karl Fulves The Epilogue
 Tricks to Go
 Amazing Self Working Card Magic 1 - 2
 Stunning Card Magic by Richard Vollmer and Aldo Colombini
 Please Hold

Notable Performances 
 In 2006 he was the Guest of Honor at Fechter's Finger-Flicking Frolic - The Original Close-Up Convention, a prestigious annual invitation-only convention limited to 200 participants.
Aldo was a featured performer at the annual convention for the Society of American Magicians in 2006, where a local news reporter described him as possessing, "... a distinctive sense of humor delivered in a delicious Italian accent."
He performed in the close-up gallery at the International Brotherhood of Magicians' 64th annual convention held in Norfolk, Virginia.
 In 1995 he performed at the Louisiana Magic Weekend convention (hosted by IBM Ring 27).

References

External links 
 http://www.wildcolombini.com
http://www.lybrary.com - Hosts many of his videos in VOD format.

Writers from Modena
American magicians
Writers from Florida
Italian emigrants to the United States
1951 births
2014 deaths
Academy of Magical Arts Lecturer of the Year winners
Academy of Magical Arts Parlour Magician of the Year winners